Frank Taffel (né Shrage Fyvel Tafel, Krystynopol, then Galicia, Austria-Hungary, now Chervonohrad, Ukraine, March 10, 1877; died 7 July 1947, Savannah, Georgia, age 70) was a journalist, a founder of Congregation Beth Jacob (Atlanta), and an advocate of Jewish causes.

Immigration and life in Atlanta
Taffel, son of Jacob Tafel, a dairy farmer, and Esther Verner, emigrated from Galicia (then Austria-Hungary, now part of Ukraine), entered the US from Montreal 1907, and became a US citizen, June 26, 1922. In 1924 he founded Atlanta's Fulton Auto Exchange, which rebuilt and sold used trucks, and he was also a commodities speculator. Taffel was a founder of Congregation Beth Jacob (Atlanta), and was one of eleven petitioners for the original charter. The Frank Taffel Sanctuary is named in his honor. Taffel frequently spoke in public on Jewish causes, and was president of the Nahum Sokolov Literary Society.  He wrote for The Atlanta Journal-Constitution, The Macon Telegraph and was Atlanta correspondent for the Jewish Morning Journal of New York.
In addition, he was president of the Atlanta Hebrew Sheltering and Immigrant Aid Society, and in 1937, over radio station WGST in Atlanta, described the work of the organization.

Taffel died on a trip to Savannah, Georgia.

References

External links
 Congregation Beth Jacob, Atlanta

1877 births
1947 deaths
People from Chervonohrad
People from the Kingdom of Galicia and Lodomeria
Jews from Galicia (Eastern Europe)
Ukrainian Jews
Austro-Hungarian emigrants to the United States
American people of Ukrainian-Jewish descent
People from Atlanta
Jewish American writers
American male journalists
American Zionists
Galicia